John Roche Ardill was an Anglican priest in Ireland, most notably Dean of Elphin and Ardagh from 1933  to 1944.

Ardill was educated at Trinity College, Dublin and ordained deacon in 1884 and priest in 1885. After  curacies in Athlone, Derryvullan and Dublin he held incumbencies in  Drumcliff and Calry.  He was an Honorary Canon of Elphin Cathedral from 1901 until 1933.

References

19th-century Irish Anglican priests
20th-century Irish Anglican priests
Deans of Elphin and Ardagh
Alumni of Trinity College Dublin